Growth/differentiation factor 15 is a protein that in humans is encoded by the GDF15 gene.  GDF15 was first identified as Macrophage inhibitory cytokine-1 or MIC-1.

It is a protein belonging to the transforming growth factor beta superfamily. Under normal conditions, GDF15 is expressed in low concentrations in most organs and upregulated because of injury of organs such as liver, kidney, heart and lung.

Function 

The function of GDF15 is not fully clear but it seems to have a role in regulating inflammatory pathways and to be involved in regulating apoptosis, angiogenesis, cell repair and cell growth, which are biological processes observed in cardiovascular and neoplastic disorders.

Clincal signficance 

GDF15 has shown to be a strong prognostic protein in patients with different diseases such as heart diseases and cancer.  

However, elevated GDF15 levels in diseases such as cancer and heart disease may be the result of inflammation caused by these diseases. Note that GDF15 is necessary for surviving both bacterial and viral infections, as well as sepsis. The protective effects of GDF15 were largely independent of pathogen control or the magnitude of inflammatory response, suggesting a role in disease tolerance. 

Metformin was shown to cause increased levels of GDF15. This increase mediates the effect of body weight loss by metformin.

Elevations in GDF15 reduce food intake and body mass in animal models through binding to glial cell-derived neurotrophic factor family receptor alpha-like (GFRAL) and the recruitment of the receptor tyrosine kinase RET in the hindbrain.

In both mice and humans have shown that metformin and exercise increase circulating levels of GDF15. GDF15 might also exert anti-inflammatory effects through mechanisms that are not fully understood. These unique and distinct mechanisms for suppressing food intake and inflammation makes GDF15 an appealing candidate to treat many metabolic diseases, including obesity, type 2 diabetes mellitus, non-alcoholic fatty liver disease, cardiovascular disease and cancer cachexia.

Fibroblast-specific loss of GDF15 expression in a model of 3D reconstructed human skin induced epidermal thinning, a hallmark of skin aging. GDF15 plays a so far undisclosed role in mitochondrial homeostasis to delay both the onset of cellular senescence and the appearance of age-related changes in a 3D human skin model.

References

External links 
GDF 15 in Oncology
 

Developmental genes and proteins
TGFβ domain